Newton Schurz Halliday (June 18, 1896 – April 6, 1918) was an American baseball player.  He appeared in a portion of one game in Major League Baseball as a first baseman for the Pittsburgh Pirates on August 19, 1916.  Halliday had three putouts and an assist in the game and struck out in his only at bat. Aside from his one major league game, there is no record of Halliday having a minor league baseball career.

Halliday joined the United States Navy after the United States entered World War I.  He attended the Great Lakes Naval Training Station, where he contracted tuberculosis, which led to his death at the age of 21.

Halliday was one of eight Major League Baseball players known either to have been killed or died from illness while serving in the armed forces during World War I.  The others were Alex Burr‚ Harry Chapman, Larry Chappell‚ Harry Glenn, Eddie Grant‚ Ralph Sharman and Bun Troy.

See also
 List of baseball players who died during their careers

References

External links

1896 births
1918 deaths
Major League Baseball first basemen
Pittsburgh Pirates players
Baseball players from Chicago
People from Great Lakes, Illinois
20th-century deaths from tuberculosis
Tuberculosis deaths in Illinois
United States Navy personnel of World War I
Deaths from pneumonia in Illinois
American military personnel killed in World War I